The Emma Olive Dobbs House, at 578 E. Locust St. in Sandy, Utah, was built in the years around 1905–10.  It was listed on the National Register of Historic Places in 1996.

It is a one-and-one-half-story Victorian style central-block-with-projecting-bays house. It has a front porch with Tuscan columns.

It was deemed significant as one of "the best preserved examples of the central-block-with-projecting-bays constructed during the
same time period in Sandy".  It was noted that it "is also expressive of the level of craftsmanship attained locally on the construction of such structures, including the use of native materials, such as the granite employed on the foundation."

References

National Register of Historic Places in Salt Lake County, Utah
1900s establishments in Utah
Houses on the National Register of Historic Places in Utah
Houses in Salt Lake County, Utah
Buildings and structures in Sandy, Utah